A D-mount is a type of lens mount commonly found on 8mm movie cameras.

Throat or thread diameter 15.88 mm (0.625 inch)
Mount thread pitch 32 TPI
Flange focal distance 12.29 mm

D-Mount lenses have found new uses in the Nikon 1 series, Fujifilm X series, Pentax Q series and other modern mirrorless cameras via adapters.

See also
 T-mount
 Lens mount
 Pentax K mount
 C-mount
 PL-mount

Lens mounts
Film and video technology